The Minister of Environment, Forestry and Fisheries (formerly Minister of Environmental Affairs) is the member of the Cabinet of South Africa.

The post was created by President Jacob Zuma, in his cabinet announced on 10 May 2009; it partially replaced the posts of Minister of Environmental Affairs and Tourism and Minister of Water Affairs and Forestry. The first holder of the position was Buyelwa Sonjica; Edna Molewa served in the position from 2010 until her death in 2018. Nomvula Mokonyane succeeded Molewa. It has also been described as one of the most efficient ministries currently in South Africa.

In May 2019, President Cyril Ramaphosa renamed the post to Minister of Forestry, Environment 
(DFFE) and appointed Barbara Creecy to the office.

Office Holders

See also
 Environmental issues in Southern Africa
 Geography of South Africa#Environmental issues
List of ministers of the environment#South Africa

References

External links
 South African Department of Environmental Affairs
 Department of Water Affairs: Ministry
 Department of Environmental Affairs: Ministry

Water and Environmental Affairs
South Africa
South Africa
Lists of political office-holders in South Africa
Water in South Africa